The Beast is a 1986 Icelandic drama film directed by Hilmar Oddsson. The film was selected as the Icelandic entry for the Best Foreign Language Film at the 59th Academy Awards, but was not accepted as a nominee.

Cast
 Edda Heiðrún Backman
 Þröstur Leó Gunnarsson
 Jóhann Sigurðarson

See also
 List of submissions to the 59th Academy Awards for Best Foreign Language Film
 List of Icelandic submissions for the Academy Award for Best Foreign Language Film

References

External links
 

1986 films
1986 drama films
1980s Icelandic-language films
Films directed by Hilmar Oddsson
Icelandic drama films